David F. Boone is an American professor of Church History and Doctrine at Brigham Young University (BYU).  He largely specializes in the history of the Church of Jesus Christ of Latter-day Saints (LDS Church) in the Southern and Southwestern United States.

Biography
Boone was born in Jacksonville, Florida.  He also grew up there as a member of the LDS Church. He was a Mormon missionary in Southern California, and then went to study at BYU.  He received his M.A. in western American history in 1981 and his Doctorate in Educational Leadership, with emphasis in LDS Church education.

Boone is married to the former Mary Farnsworth, and they have eight children.

Publications
Among other writings Boone has written on Zion's Camp.  He was also a major contributor to the Encyclopedia of Latter-day Saint History.  He has also written an article on the LDS Church in Britain during World War II.

Notes

Sources
BYU faculty page

External links
 

21st-century American historians
21st-century American male writers
American Latter Day Saint writers
American Mormon missionaries in the United States
Brigham Young University alumni
Brigham Young University faculty
Historians of the Latter Day Saint movement
Writers from Jacksonville, Florida
Living people
Latter Day Saints from Florida
Year of birth missing (living people)
Historians from Florida
American male non-fiction writers